Quintessence is an album by American jazz pianist Bill Evans. It was recorded in 1976 for Fantasy Records and released the following year. At this time usually playing solo or with his trio, for these sessions Evans was the leader of an all-star quintet featuring Harold Land on tenor saxophone, guitarist Kenny Burrell, Ray Brown on bass, and Philly Joe Jones on drums.

Reception

Writing for AllMusic, music critic Scott Yanow called the album "a nice change of pace".

Track listing
 "Sweet Dulcinea Blue" (Kenny Wheeler) – 6:02
 "Martina" (Michel Legrand, Eddy Marnay, Hal Shaper) – 8:12
 "Second Time Around" (Jimmy Van Heusen, Sammy Cahn) – 3:41
 "A Child Is Born" (Thad Jones, Alec Wilder) – 7:30
 "Bass Face" (Kenny Burrell) – 10:04

Personnel
Bill Evans – piano
Harold Land – tenor saxophone
Kenny Burrell – guitar
Ray Brown – bass
Philly Joe Jones – drums

Technical personnel
Helen Keane – producer
Phil Kaffel – engineer
Phil DeLancie – remastering
Galen Rowell – cover photo
Phil Bray – booklet photos

Chart positions

References

External links
The Bill Evans Memorial Library
Jazz Discography

1977 albums
Bill Evans albums
Fantasy Records albums